The 1933 New Hampshire Wildcats football team was an American football team that represented the University of New Hampshire as a member of the New England Conference during the 1933 college football season. In its 18th season under head coach William "Butch" Cowell, the team played its home games in Durham, New Hampshire, at Memorial Field. The team compiled a 3–3–1 record, and were outscored by their opponents, 65–51.

Schedule

The university's website notes that 1933 team captain Robert Haphey had the team's mascot named in his honor during the prior season. The team had procured an actual wildcat, and decided to name it after "the first player to score for NH." Haphey earned that honor, and the wildcat was given his nickname, Skippy. Haphey served in the United States Army from 1934 to 1960, retiring as a lieutenant colonel with service in World War II and the Korean War—he died in November 1989 at age 81.

Notes

References

New Hampshire
New Hampshire Wildcats football seasons
New Hampshire Wildcats football